is a Japanese voice actor affiliated with the agency VIMS.

Biography
Murase was born in the United States, but grew up in Aichi, Japan. He lived in Aichi until graduating from high school, after which he attended university in Kyoto Prefecture. Later, he moved to Tokyo.

After showing an interest in theatre, Murase joined the Japan Narration Actors Institute with the aim of becoming a voice actor. In 2011, he made his debut as a voice actor in the role of a male student in the TV anime Persona 4: The Animation. The following year, he played the first main character in the role of Shun Aonuma (14 years old) in From the New World. In 2014, he starred in the role of Shoyo Hinata in Haikyu!!.

In 2016, Murase won the Seiyu Award for Best Male Rookie.

Filmography

Television animation

Theatrical animation

Original video animation (OVA)
Haikyu!! (2014), Shoyo Hinata
Yarichin Bitch Club (2018), Kyōsuke Yaguchi

Original net animation (ONA)
Sword Gai The Animation (2018), Kuromaru
The Heike Story (2021), Taira no Atsumori
Spriggan (2022), Colonel McDougal
Record of Ragnarok II (2023), Zerofuku

Multimedia Project

Paradox live / BAE (2020) (48 / Yeon Hajun)
 Clock over orquesta  (2021) (Tenma Rikka)
 VS AMBIVALENZ  (2021) (Auguri & Futaba)

Video games
Azure Striker Gunvolt (2014) (Nova/Shiden)
J-Stars Victory Vs (2014) (Shōyō Hinata)
Granblue Fantasy (2014) (Hal, Ulamnuran)
THE iDOLM@STER: SideM (2014) (Kanon Himeno)
Hamatora: Look at Smoking World (2014) (Pero)
I-Chu (2015) (Kokoro Hanabusa)
Ensemble Stars! (2015) (Tori Himemiya)
Digimon Story: Cyber Sleuth (2015) (Yuugo Kamishiro)
Sword Art Online: Lost Song (2015) (Recon/Shinichi Nagata)Tokyo Mirage Sessions ♯FE (2015) (Gordin)Touken Ranbu (2015) (Sayo Samonji)Utawarerumono: Mask of Deception (2015) (Kiuru)Street Fighter V (2016) (Sean Matsuda)Mighty No. 9 (2016) (Beck)Pokémon Sun and Moon (2016) (Wishiwashi)Final Fantasy XV (2016) (Talcott (teenage))Utawarerumono: Mask of Truth (2016) (Kiuru)Cocktail Prince (2017) (Caipirinha & Caipiroska)Fire Emblem Heroes (2017) (Gordin and Soren)Sengoku Night Blood (2017) (Sasuke Sarutobi)Super Bomberman R (2017) (Green Bomberman)Xenoblade Chronicles 2 (2017) (Corvin/Kamuya)Digimon Story: Cyber Sleuth - Hacker's Memory (2017) (Yuugo Kamishiro)Food Fantasy (2018) (Double Scoop & Long Bao)Dragalia Lost (2018) (Irfan)Ikemen Revolution (2016) (Loki Genetta)Chrono Ma:Gia (2018) (Leo Bloomfield)Puzzle & Dragons (2012) (Suou)Dragon: Marked for Death (2019) (Shinobi) (Voice D)Bleach Brave Souls (2018) (Hikone Ubuginu)Grand Chase Dimensional Chaser (2018) (Ronan Erudon)Onmyoji (2019) (Ungaikyou)Edge of Awakening (2019) (Shiou)Pokémon Masters (2019) (Wally)World Flipper (2019) (Adoni)
Mahoutsukai no Yakusoku (2019) (Mitile)Genshin Impact (2020) (Venti)Fate/Grand Order (2021) (Setanta)Rune Factory 5 (2021) (Cecile)Arknights (2021) (Mizuki)Identity V (2021) (Victor Grantz) Helios Rising Heroes (2021) (Leonard Wright Jr.)Fuga: Melodies of Steel (2021) (Malt Marzipan)Captain Tsubasa: Dream Team (2017) (Aoi Shingo)Fuga: Melodies of Steel 2 (2023) (Malt Marzipan)

Dubbing
Live-actionThe 100 (Monty Green (Christopher Larkin))Aquaman (Young Arthur (Thirteen Years Old) (Otis Dhanji))Beasts of No Nation (Agu (Abraham Attah))Boychoir (Stetson "Stet" Tate (Garrett Wareing))Daniel Isn't Real (Luke Nightingale (Miles Robbins))Daredevil (Matt Murdock (young) (Skylar Gaertner))The Dark Tower (Jake Chambers (Tom Taylor))Euphoria (Ashtray (Javon "Wanna" Walton))Falling Skies (season 4 onwards) (Matt Mason (Maxim Knight))The Flash (Wally West/Kid Flash (Keiynan Lonsdale))The Games Maker (Ivan Drago (David Mazouz))Insidious: Chapter 2 (Dalton Lambert (Ty Simpkins))Jurassic World (2017 NTV edition) (Gray Mitchell (Ty Simpkins))The Last Ship (Ray Diaz (Adam Irigoyen))The Maze Runner (Chuck (Blake Cooper))Once Upon a Time (Baelfire (young) (Dylan Schmid))Paper Towns (Benjamin "Ben" Starling (Austin Abrams))Rent (Angel Dumott Schunard (Wilson Jermaine Heredia))Shazam! (2021 THE CINEMA edition) (Freddy Freeman (Jack Dylan Grazer))St. Vincent (Robert Ocinski (Dario Barosso))Thunderbirds Are Go (Alan Tracy)Uncharted (Young Nathan Drake (Tiernan Jones))

AnimationThe Boss Baby: Family Business (Connie)Mechamato (Amato)

Discographygrade skipping'' Sakura Yanagi

References

External links
 Official agency profile 
 
 

1988 births
Living people
Japanese male video game actors
Japanese male voice actors
Male voice actors from Aichi Prefecture
Seiyu Award winners
21st-century Japanese male actors